Weakening may refer to

 Weakening (logic), a structural rule in proof theory
 Weakening (linguistics), a sound change that can be described as weakening a consonant